The Our Lady of Joy Abbey is a monastery at Tai Shui Hang, on Lantau Island in the New Territories, Hong Kong. It is home to a number of Roman Catholic monks of the Cistercian Order of the Strict Observance, or Trappists.

Name
It adopted its new, official name "Our Lady of Joy Abbey" on 15 January, 2000.

Monastic Community

Dom. Paul Kao, Abbot
Rev. William Young, Sub-Prior & Treasurer
Rev. Giles Chong
Rev. Clement Kong
Rev. Benedict Chao
Rev. Raphael Kang
Rev. Andrew Qin
Rev. Bruno Sie
Rev. Deacon Paul Li
Bro. Peter Gao
Bro. Bosco Mo
Bro. James Truong
Bro. Simon Tsui
Bro. Antonius Yiu

Simple Vows: 1

Novice: 1

Past superiors

Titular priors 
Rev. Paulinus Lee (31/02/1941 – 03/02/1965)
Rev. Simeon Chang (21/05/1965 – 17/06/1974)
Rev. Benedict Chao (31/07/1974 – 04/08/1992)

Superiors ad nutum 
Rev. Benedict Chao (04/08/1992 — 11/07/1998)
Rev. Mauru Pei (11/07/1998 – 05/09/1999)
Rev. Anastasius Li (27/07/2003 – 07/11/2004)

Abbots 
Dom. Clement Kong (05/09/1999 — 01/07/2003)
Dom. Anastasius Li (07/11/2004 – 07/11/2010)
Dom. Paul Kao (2016 - Present)

Notable monks
Rev. Nicholas Kao Se Tseien

Consumer product
The factory, however, is now located in Tai Sang Wai, at 28½ miles, Castle Peak Road – Tam Mei, Yuen Long District.

Around the monastery some of the last free roaming feral cattle in Hong Kong can be seen, being the descendants of the cattle released after the closure of the dairy farm.

Access

The monastery is located on a scenic hiking trail leading from Discovery Bay via Nim Shue Wan to Mui Wo. It provides a resting point halfway through the hike.

The monastery can also be accessed by kai-to ferry from Peng Chau.

References

External links

 
 Lantau Online: Trappist Haven Monastery

Christian monasteries in Hong Kong
Lantau Island
Trappist monasteries
Trappist monasteries in China